The 2020 Portland Thorns FC season was the team's and the league's eighth season of existence. The Thorns played in the National Women's Soccer League (NWSL), the top division of women's soccer in the United States. Due to the COVID-19 pandemic, on March 12, 2020 the Thorns canceled their preseason tournament, scheduled for March 29-April 4. On March 20, 2020, the NWSL postponed the start of the league's regular season indefinitely.

Team

Coaching staff

Current squad

Competitions

Challenge Cup

Preliminary round

Standings

Knockout round

2020 Fall Series

Standings

Transactions

NWSL Draft 

Draft picks are not automatically signed to the team roster. The 2020 NWSL College Draft was held on January 16, 2020.

Transfers out

Expansion Draft 

The 2020 NWSL Expansion Draft was a special draft held on November 12, 2020, by the National Women's Soccer League (NWSL) for Racing Louisville FC, an expansion team, to select players from existing teams in the league. The league allowed Louisville to select up to 18 players from lists of unprotected players provided by the existing nine NWSL teams.

Protected players 
Racing Louisville FC selected the playing rights of Tobin Heath, which the Thorns retained while she was playing for Manchester United W.F.C. in the Women's Super League.

 Bold indicates players selected in the Expansion Draft
 Blue highlights indicate United States federation players
 Italics indicate players who are not under contract but whose NWSL playing rights remain with the team

References

External links

See also
 2020 National Women's Soccer League season
 2020 in American soccer

Portland Thorns FC
Portland Thorns FC
Portland Thorns FC seasons